Maia Emilia Ninel Morgenstern (born 1 May 1962) is a Romanian film and stage actress, described by Florin Mitu of AMOS News as "a symbol of Romanian theater and film". In the English-speaking world, she is best known for portraying the Blessed Virgin Mary in Mel Gibson's The Passion of the Christ. In Romania, she has been nationally known since her 1992 role as Nela in Balanța, a film known in the United States as The Oak, set during the waning days of Communist Romania. She received a star on the Romanian Walk of Fame in Bucharest on 1 May 2011.

Biography
Born in Bucharest, Romania, to a Jewish family, she 
attended the Zoia Kosmodeminskaia High School in her native city, and graduated from the Film and Theatre Academy of Bucharest in 1985. She then played at  Teatrul Tineretului (Youth Theater) in Piatra Neamț until 1988, and at the Teatrul Evreiesc de Stat (State Jewish Theatre) in Bucharest 1988, 1989, and 1990. From 1990 to 1998 she was a member of the company of the National Theatre in Bucharest, and since 1998 of Teatrul Bulandra, also in Bucharest; in addition, she continues to act at the Jewish State Theatre and other Bucharest theaters and elsewhere in Romania. Among her notable stage roles in recent years, in a Romanian-language production of The Blue Angel (Îngerul Albastru in Romanian) at Bucharest's Odeon Theater, in 2001-2 she played (to great critical acclaim) Lola Lola, the character made famous by Marlene Dietrich. At the same time, she was also playing the role of Kathleen Hogan in a Romanian-language production of Israel Horovitz's Park Your Car in Harvard Yard at the State Jewish Theater.

Morgenstern has appeared in numerous films, primarily in Romanian language roles. In The Passion of the Christ, she performs a role in Aramaic, but like the other actors in the cast of that film, she simply memorized her lines phonetically.

Her surname, Morgenstern, means "Morning Star" in German, a title of the Virgin Mary, the character she played in The Passion of the Christ. Mel Gibson, a devout Traditionalist Catholic, thought this of great significance when casting her. In interviews, she has defended The Passion of the Christ against allegations of antisemitism, saying that the high priest Caiaphas is portrayed not as a representative of the Jewish people, but as a leader of the establishment, adding that "Authorities throughout history have persecuted individuals with revolutionary ideas."

On 29 March 2021, a Romanian man was arrested after Morgenstern received an email stating "I intend to throw her in the gas chamber".

Personal life
She has been married twice, first to Claudiu Istodor (1983–1999), and then to  Dumitru Băltățeanu (2001–2015). She has 3 children: Tudor Aaron, an actor, Eva Leea Cabiria and Ana Isadora.

Awards, recognition
She has won several major awards as an actress: 
 Best Actress for: Cei care platesc cu viața ("Those who pay with their lives", 1991), Romanian Filmmakers Union
UNITER (Romanian Theatrical Union) Lucia Sturdza Bulandra Prize (1990) for her stage role as Medea in Trilogia antică (Ancient Trilogy), directed by Andrei Șerban.
 Best Actress for: Balanța (1992), European Film Awards
 Best Actress for: Balanța (1992), Cinéma Tout Ecran (Geneva Film Festival)
 Best Actress for: Balanța (1992), Romanian Filmmakers Union
 UNITER best actress award (1993), for her role in Ghetto at the Romanian National Theatre.
 UNITER (1995) award for her performance in the stage production of Lola Blau.
 Best Film Actress for: The Passion of the Christ (2004), Ethnic Multicultural Media Awards (EMMA Awards), UK

Filmography 
Where translations of titles are italicized, it indicates use of the translated title for the film in English-language release.

References

Romanian stage actresses
Romanian film actresses
European Film Award for Best Actress winners
Caragiale National University of Theatre and Film alumni
Actresses from Bucharest
Romanian Jews
Jewish actresses
1962 births
Living people